Ohio State basketball may refer to:

Ohio State Buckeyes men's basketball
Ohio State Buckeyes women's basketball